The Mirek Topolánek's Cabinet may refer to:
Mirek Topolánek's First Cabinet, 2006–2007
Mirek Topolánek's Second Cabinet, 2007–2009